Two to Tango, also known as Matar es morir un poco, is a 1989 American-Argentine suspense film directed by Héctor Olivera and based on the classic novel Last Days of the Victim by José Pablo Feinmann, who also co-wrote the screenplay. It was one in a number of ten movies Roger Corman produced in Argentina during the 1980s.

Synopsis
A professional assassin who does not wish to continue as such receives an order from his employer (a mysterious "Company") to kill one last target in Buenos Aires. While completing this task, he falls in love with the lover of his future victim, to whom he proposes fleeing to Nepal together. But suddenly everything gets complicated.

Cast
 Don Stroud ... James Conrad
 Adrianne Sachs ... Cecilia Lorca
 Duilio Marzio ... Paulino Velasco
 Michael Cavanaugh ... Dean Boyle
 Alberto Segado ... Lorenzo 'Lucky' Lara
 Francisco Cocuzza ... Carlos Pino
 Golde Flami ... Hilda Levin
 Nathán Pinzón ... Morelos
 Juan José Ghisalberti ... Joseph Levin
 Ricardo Hamlin ... Bates
 Jose Luis Cabrera ... Tango Dancer
 Pablo Novak ... Sergio
 Adriana Salonia ... Adela
 Ana Maria Vita ... Boarder 1 at Levin's Hotel
 Alejandra De Luiggi ... Boarder 2 at Levin's Hotel
 Flávia Aberg Cobo ... Airline Attendant 1
 Maria Fournery ... Airline Attendant 2
 Armando Capo ... Angelo
 Ricardo Fasan ... Paolo Basso (as Ricardo Fassan)
 Lilian Rinar ... Blonde Woman
 Gianni Fiore ... Customs Employee (as Gianni Fiori)
 Daniel Ripari ... Bodyguard 1
 Arturo Noal ... Bodyguard 2
 Rubén Bermúdez ... Bodyguard 3
 Nestor Cannichio ... Lara's Driver

Production
The film was based on the classic novel Ultimas dias de la victima, by Argentine screenwriter, philosopher and novelist Jose Pablo Feinmann. The book was adapted as a movie for the first time in the Argentinian film Últimos días de la víctima (1982).

The story was totally rewritten by a U.S. screenwriter, Yolanda Finch (Yolande Turner), together with Feinmann, for a North American audience.

References

External links
 

1980s crime thriller films
Argentine thriller drama films
English-language Argentine films
1980s thriller drama films
Films set in Buenos Aires
American thriller drama films
1989 drama films
1989 films
1980s English-language films
1980s American films
Films directed by Héctor Olivera
1980s Argentine films